Eucalyptus multicaulis, commonly known as the whipstick mallee ash, is a species of mallee that is endemic to New South Wales. It has smooth bark, lance-shaped or curved adult leaves, oval to club-shaped flower buds in groups of between seven and fifteen, white flowers and conical fruit.

Description
It has smooth white or grey bark, sometimes with rough bark near the base of the trunks. Flowering occurs from September to November and the flowers are white.

Taxonomy and naming
Eucalyptus multicaulis was first formally described in 1927 by William Blakely in the Journal and Proceedings of the Royal Society of New South Wales. The specific epithet is from the Latin multi- meaning "many" and caulis meaning "stem", referring to the mallee habit of this species.

Distribution and habitat
Whipstick mallee ash grows on sandstone ridges in mallee shrubland from east of Rylstone to the Budawangs.

References 

multicaulis
Myrtales of Australia
Flora of New South Wales
Mallees (habit)
Plants described in 1927
Taxa named by William Blakely